The Lordship of Schellenberg was a historic state of the Holy Roman Empire, now located in the Principality of Liechtenstein. Its capital was the town of Schellenberg.

Geography
Located north of the County of Vaduz, its area corresponds to the current electoral district of Unterland. The territory included the current municipalities of Eschen, Gamprin, Mauren, Ruggell and Schellenberg.

History
The lordship was constituted in the 9th century by Charlemagne, and purchased to the Counts of Vaduz in 1437, becoming de facto a dependency united to the County of Vaduz. After the Swabian War in 1499, both came under Austrian suzerainty. Different dynasties of counts bought and sold them, until their purchase in 1699 by Hans-Adam I, Prince of Liechtenstein, for 115,000 guilders; he had been granted princely status in 1706, but needed to acquire a territory with imperial immediacy in order to vote in the Diet of the Princes of the Empire. In 1712, the Liechtenstein dynasty also purchased the nearby County of Vaduz, for 290,000 guilders. The Holy Roman Emperor Charles VI, formally united Vaduz and Schellenberg in 1719 as the Principality of Liechtenstein.

See also
County of Werdenberg
History of Liechtenstein

References

External links
Lordship of Schellenberg (states-world.com)

Schellenberg, Lordship of
History of Liechtenstein
1719 disestablishments in Europe
States and territories disestablished in 1719